Deh Riz (also Romanized as Deh Rīz, Dehraz, and Deīrīz) is a village in Bardesareh Rural District, Oshtorinan District, Borujerd County, Lorestan Province, Iran. At the 2006 census, its population was 1,549, in 371 families.

References 

Towns and villages in Borujerd County